Martinho da Vila (born February 12, 1938) is a Brazilian singer and composer who is considered to be one of the main representatives of samba and MPB. He is a prolific songwriter, with hundreds of recorded songs across over 40 solo albums. He also has many songs that were recorded by singers from different musical genres.

Internationally celebrated artists such as Nana Mouskouri (Greece), Ornella Vanoni (Italy), Katia Guerreiro (Portugal), Rosario Flores (Spain) have put their voices to Martinho’s songs and lyrics.

As a singer, he is considered by critics as one of the top exponents of samba to have ever lived. Among his many national collaborations, a few notable names are Zeca Pagodinho, Arlindo Cruz, Chico Buarque, Beth Carvalho, Noel Rosa, Alcione, among others. Furthermore, Martinho composed some of the most important samba enredos (samba school themed songs) and has forged a solid partnership with the Vila Isabel samba school.

In spite of being a self-taught singer / songwriter with no academic background, Martinho has a great connection with classical music. He participated in the symphonic project "Samba Classics" under the baton of the late Maestro Silvio Barbato, which went on to be performed by several classical orchestras such as the Belo Horizonte, Brasilia, and Espirito Santo Orchestras, as well as the Orquestra Petrobras and the Orfeônica of Denmark. He also devised, in partnership with Maestro Bruno Leonardo, the Black Concert, a Symphonic performance that focuses on the participation of black musicians in classical music.

In addition to being a celebrated singer and songwriter, Martinho is also a writer and author of 13 books: Notable works include Os Lusófonos, republished in Portugal, as well as Joanna and Joanes - A Fluminense Romance, and Ópera Negra, which was later translated into French. At the Book Fair in Paris in 2015, Martinho released his novel Os Lusófonos.

As a journalist, Martinho writes articles for O Globo, Folha de São Paulo and O Estadão newspapers, several magazines, and, for two years, he was a weekly columnist of the newspaper O Dia.

He is also politically active and a prominent figure and spokesperson for Afro-Brazilian issues as well as for the Communist Party of Brazil. He is the author of six books, and has been a recording artist since 1969.

Apart from his own interpretations, Simone stands out as one of his greatest interpreters, with a whole album dedicated to him, entitled Café com leite.

Biography 
Martinho da Vila’s artistic career became public at the III Festival of Record, in 1967, when he entered the competition with the song "Menina Moça". However, success came the following year, in the fourth edition of the same festival, with the song "Casa de Bamba," one of Martinho's classics. The first album, released in 1969, entitled Martinho da Vila, already demonstrated the extent of his talent as a composer and musician, which, in addition to "Casa de Bamba", showcased masterpieces such as "O Pequeno Burguês," "Quem é do Mar não enjoa" and "Pra que Dinheiro" among other gems such as" Brasil Mulato", "Amor pra que Nasceu" and "Tom Maior". 
He soon became one of the most respected Brazilian artists as well as one of the major album sellers in Brazil. He was only the second samba recording artist to exceed the mark of one million copies sold with the CD Tá Delícia, Tá Gostoso released in 1995 (the first was Agepê, which in 1984 sold a million and a half copies with his Brazilian Mix album).

At the closing ceremony of the 2016 Rio Olympics, Martinho performed onstage in the Maracanã Stadium, singing "" with his three daughters and one granddaughter.

Awards 
Among the titles received are Carioca Citizen (for citizens of Rio de Janeiro), Citizen Benefactor of the state of Rio de Janeiro, Commander of the official degree in Republic and the Order of Cultural Merit, for his contribution to Brazilian culture. In his musical career, in 1991 Martinho won the Shell Award for Brazilian Popular Music. In 2014, he was nominated to the Latin Grammy for Best Samba / Pagode Album. In 2021, da Vila was one of the recipients of the Latin Grammy Lifetime Achievement Award, and his album Rio: Só Vendo a Vista was nominated in the same ceremony in the Best Samba/Pagode Album category.

Samba School 
His dedication to the beloved GRES Unidos de Vila Isabel, began in 1965. Before that, he used to be a regular at the Aprendizes da Boca do Mato samba school. Since joining Vila Isabel, he has written dozens of songs for the school. He wrote the samba “Kizomba: A Festa da Raça”, which secured Special Group title in 1988. 
After a 17-year hiatus, in 2010, Martinho won the sambas enredo contest again, providing the school’s theme - Noel Rosa, another composer of Vila Isabel, to celebrate his centenary. Martinho had said that would be his last samba enredo. In 2013, when Martinho turned 75, his son Tonico da Vila took Vila Isabel to the title with the theme “A Vila Canta o Brasil, Celeiro do Mundo. Água no Feijão, que Chegou Mais Um”. [5]

Discography 
 1969 –  Martinho da Vila – (RCA Victor)
 1970 –  Meu Laiá-raiá – (RCA Victor)
 1971 –  Memórias de um Sargento de Milícias – (RCA Victor)
 1972 –  Batuque na Cozinha – (RCA Victor)
1973 –  Origens (Pelo telefone) – (RCA Victor)
 1974 –  Canta Canta, Minha Gente – (RCA Victor)
 1975 –  Maravilha de Cenário – (RCA Victor)
 1976 –  Rosa do Povo – (RCA Victor)
 1976 –  La Voglia La Pazzia/L'Incoxienza/L' Allegria – (RCA Victor)
 1977 –  Presente – (RCA Victor)
 1978 –  Tendinha – (RCA Victor)
 1979 –  Terreiro, Sala e Salão – (RCA Victor)
 1980 –  Portuñol Latinoamericano – (RCA Victor)
 1980 –  Samba Enredo – (RCA Victor)
 1981 –  Sentimentos – (RCA Victor)
 1982 –  Verso e Reverso – (RCA Victor)
 1983 –  Novas Palavras – (RCA Victor)
 1984 –  Martinho da Vila Isabel – (RCA Victor)
 1984 –  Partido Alto Nota 10 – (CID)
 1985 –  Criações e Recriações – (RCA Victor)
 1986 –  Batuqueiro – (RCA Victor)
 1987 –  Coração Malandro – (RCA Victor/Ariola)
 1988 –  Festa da Raça – (CBS)
 1989 –  O Canto das Lavadeiras – (CBS)
 1990 –  Martinho da Vida – (CBS)
 1991 –  Vai Meu Samba, Vai – (Columbia/Sony Music)
 1992 –  No Templo da Criação– (Columbia/Sony Music)
 1992 –  Martinho da Vila – (Columbia/Sony Music)
 1993 –  Escola de Samba Enredo Vila Isabel – (Columbia/Sony Music)
 1994 –  Ao Rio de Janeiro (Columbia/Sony Music)
 1995 –  Tá Delícia, tá Gostoso – (Sony Music)
 1997 –  Coisas de Deus – (Sony Music)
 1997 –  Butiquim do Martinho – (Sony Music) 758.325/2-479455
 1999 –  3.0 Turbinado ao Vivo – (Sony Music)
 1999 –  Pai da Alegria – (Sony Music)
 2000 –  Lusofonia – (Sony Music)
 2001 –  Martinho da Vila, da Roça e da Cidade– (Sony Music)
 2002 –  Martinho Definitivo – (Sony Music)
 2002 –  Voz e Coração – (Sony Music)
 2003 –  Martinho da Vila – Conexões – (MZA)
 2004 –  Conexões Ao Vivo – (MZA/Universal Music Group)
 2005 –  Brasilatinidade – (MZA/EMI)
 2006 –  Brasilatinidade Ao Vivo – (MZA/EMI)
 2006 –  Martinho José Ferreira – Ao Vivo na Suíça – (MZA/Universal Music) (recording-shows at Montreux Jazz Festival, in Switzerland, nellin 1988, 2000 and 2006)
 2007 –  Martinho da Vila do Brasil e do Mundo (MZA / Universal Music)
 2008 –  O Pequeno Burguês – ao vivo (MZA Music)
 2010 –  Poeta Da Cidade – Canta Noel

Gallery

Further reading 

1. Bocskay, Stephen (2017). "Undesired Presences: Samba, Improvisation, and Afro-Politics in 1970s Brazil". Latin American Research Review. 52 (1): 64–78.

2. Bocskay, Stephen (2012). Voices of Samba: Music and The Brazilian Racial Imaginary (1955-1988) (Doctorate). Providence, Rhode Island: Brown University.

References

External links 
 Official site

1938 births
Afro-Brazilian male singers
Living people
Latin Grammy Award winners
Brazilian composers
People from Rio de Janeiro (state)
Música Popular Brasileira singers
20th-century Brazilian male singers
20th-century Brazilian singers
Samba musicians
Samba enredo composers
Latin Grammy Lifetime Achievement Award winners
21st-century Brazilian male singers
21st-century Brazilian singers